Yulie (alternatively spelled Yuli) is a given name in multiple languages, including Spanish and Hebrew.

In Hebrew, Yulie (יולי) is a gender-neutral name that translates to "July." In 2015, it was the 99th most popular feminine name in Israel.

People 

 Yulie Cohen (born 1956), Israeli filmmaker
 Yuli Edelstein (born 1958), Israeli politician
 Yuli Ofer (1924-2011), Israeli businessman
 Yuli Tamir (born 1954), Israeli politician

References